Stelis is a genus of kleptoparasitic bees in the family Megachilidae. There are at least 100 described species in Stelis.

Description

One study of the species Stelis ater found they differed a bit from other thieving bees by being hospicidal (host-killing) at all larval stages, and neither it nor its host larva move much, so it is simply a matter of chance when its growth brings it into contact with the host rather than with just the provisions. This is in contrast to other kleptoparasitic bees which usually have their more mobile first instar larva kill the host larva.

See also
 List of Stelis species

References

Further reading

External links

Megachilidae
Bee genera